Tom Frantzen (born 1954), is a Belgian sculptor, known for his street images.

Biography
Frantzen was born in 1954 in Brussels and studied at the National School of Architecture and Visual Arts, La Cambre.
In 1977 he built his own foundry. He made study tours in France, Germany, Italy and the United States. Until 1990 he cast his images himself; since then he has contracted this work out.

Main works

Vaartkapoen, 1985
Het Zinneke, Brussels, 1998
Madame chapeau, Brussels
De renaissance van de droom van Icarus, Steenokkerzeel, 2007
De acrobaten, Berchem, 2012
Bruegelbeeld, Brussels, 2015
L'Envol, a statue depicting Jacques Brel, Brussels, 2017

References

External links

langs de beelden van Tom Frantzen, schepen wilde niet dat Zinneke zou plassen 
Sculptures 2459, 599, 1016 on www.standbeelden.be
zwijndrecht.be
randkrant.be
Blog on La Libre Belgique

1954 births
Living people
Belgian sculptors
People from Watermael-Boitsfort